Victim Five, also known as Code 7, Victim 5!, originally filmed as Table Bay, is a 1964 British crime film produced by Harry Alan Towers and US television producer Arthur "Skip" Steloff that was shot in Cape Town in Technicolor and Techniscope. It was directed by Robert Lynn and starred Lex Barker, Ronald Fraser, Ann Smyrner, and Walter Rilla.

Premise
New York City private detective Steve Martin is hired for protection by Wexler, a wealthy German living in Cape Town. After Wexler's butler is murdered and an assassination attempt is made on Martin and Wexler's secretary Helga, Martin discovers a photograph of four people including Wexler and his butler that indicates that all those in the photograph are marked for death and there will be five victims.

Cast

Reception
The New York Times praised "fine views of Cape Town" but thought the film was not "necessary". The MFB said it was "efficiently worked out" and praised the "large variety of South African locations."

References

External links

Code 7 Victim 5 at Letterbox DVD

1964 films
1964 crime films
1960s English-language films
British detective films
Police detective films
Films directed by Robert Lynn
Films set in South Africa
Films shot in South Africa
British crime films
1960s British films